Marsh Creek is a tributary of Bowman Creek in Wyoming County, Pennsylvania, in the United States. The creek is not designated as an impaired waterbody. Wild trout naturally reproduce within it. The watershed of Marsh Creek is designated as a High-Quality Coldwater Fishery and a Migratory Fishery. The creek has several bridges crossing it.

Course

Marsh Creek begins at the base of a ridge in Northmoreland Township. It flows northeast for a short distance before turning north for more than a mile and passing through a large wetland. The creek then turns northwest for a few tenths of a mile before turning north for a few tenths of a mile and crossing Pennsylvania Route 292. At this point, it turns west-northwest for several tenths of a mile before crossing Pennsylvania Route 292 again, passing through Eaton Township, and receiving Sugar Run, its only named tributary, from the left. For almost all of the rest of its length, it flows along the border of Eaton Township and Monroe Township. The creek then turns north-northwest for several tenths of a mile, crossing Pennsylvania Route 292 for a third time. It then turns west for several tenths of a mile as its valley narrows. The creek then turns north for several tenths of a mile before turning northeast for several tenths of a mile and reaching its confluence with Bowman Creek.

Tributaries
Marsh Creek has one named tributary, which is known as Sugar Run.

Hydrology
Marsh Creek is not designated as an impaired waterbody.

Geography and geology

Marsh Creek is a very small stream; it has been described as "tiny". At the point where the creek meets Bowman Creek, there is a deep pool of water on the latter creek, known as Barn Pool.

The surficial geology in the vicinity of the mouth of Marsh Creek consists of alluvium and Wisconsinan Ice-Contact Stratified Drift. Further upstream, the surficial geology consists of Wisconsinan Till and bedrock consisting of sandstone and shale, though there are some patches of alluvium, Wisconsinan Ice-Contact Stratified Drift, and wetlands.

Watershed
The creek is entirely within the United States Geological Survey quadrangle of Center Moreland.

Marsh Creek is one of the major tributaries of Bowman Creek.

Some residential and/or commercial land infringes upon the 100-year floodplain of Marsh Creek and its tributaries. A road known as Jenks Road crosses the creek at its mouth.

History

Marsh Creek was entered into the Geographic Names Information System on August 2, 1979. Its identifier in the Geographic Names Information System is 1199111.

A steel stringer/multi-beam or girder bridge carrying T-338/Jenks Road over Marsh Creek was built in 1920 and repaired in 1982.

Biology
The drainage basin of Marsh Creek is designated as a High-Quality Coldwater Fishery and a Migratory Fishery. Wild trout naturally reproduce in the creek from its headwaters downstream to its mouth.

See also
 Sugar Hollow Creek, next tributary of Bowman Creek going downstream
 Roaring Run (Bowman Creek), next tributary of Bowman Creek going upstream
 List of rivers of Pennsylvania
 List of tributaries of Bowman Creek

References

Rivers of Wyoming County, Pennsylvania
Tributaries of Bowman Creek
Rivers of Pennsylvania